The 2006–07 Holy Cross Crusaders men's basketball team represented the College of the Holy Cross during the 2006–07 NCAA Division I men's basketball season. The Crusaders, led by 8th-year head coach Ralph Willard, played their home games at the Hart Center and were members of the Patriot League. They finished the season 25–9, 13–1 in Patriot League play to win the regular season league title. As the #1 seed, they defeated Lafayette, American, and Bucknell to be champions of the Patriot League tournament and earn the conference's automatic bid to the NCAA tournament. Playing as the No. 13 seed in the West region, they were beaten by No. 4 seed Southern Illinois.

Roster

Schedule and results

|-
!colspan=9 style=|Non-conference regular season

|-
!colspan=9 style=|Patriot League regular season

|-
!colspan=9 style=| Patriot League Tournament

|-
!colspan=9 style=|NCAA Tournament

References

Holy Cross Crusaders men's basketball seasons
Holy Cross
Holy Cross Crusaders men's basketball
Holy Cross Crusaders men's basketball
Holy Cross